is an open-air architectural museum/theme park in Inuyama, near Nagoya in Aichi prefecture, Japan. It was opened on March 18, 1965. The museum preserves historic buildings from Japan's Meiji (1867–1912), Taishō (1912–1926), and early Shōwa (1926–1947) periods. Over 60 historical buildings have been moved and reconstructed onto  of rolling hills alongside Lake Iruka. The most noteworthy building there is the reconstructed main entrance and lobby of Frank Lloyd Wright's landmark Imperial Hotel, which originally stood in Tokyo from 1923 to 1967, when the main structure was demolished to make way for a new, larger version of the hotel.

History 

The Meiji era was a period of rapid change in Japan. After centuries of isolation, Japan began to incorporate ideas from the west, including building styles and construction techniques.

Meiji-mura was started by Yoshirō Taniguchi (谷口 吉郎 Taniguchi Yoshirō 1904–79), an architect, and Motoo Tsuchikawa (土川元夫 Tsuchikawa Moto-o, 1903–74), then vice president and later president of Nagoya Railroad (Meitetsu). While riding the Yamanote line in Tokyo, Taniguchi lamented the sight of the demolition of the Rokumeikan, a symbol of Meiji era architecture. He appealed to his college classmate Tsuchikawa to join him in working to preserve western style Meiji era buildings of cultural or historical importance. On July 16, 1962 they formed a foundation for this purpose, with Nagoya Railroad providing the funding. Meiji-mura was opened on March 18, 1965 on the banks of the Lake Iruka reservoir, operated under Nagoya Railroad with Taniguchi as museum director, with 15 buildings.

Meiji-mura's goal is to preserve these historic early examples of western architecture mixed with Japanese construction techniques and materials. Incidentally, many of the buildings were saved from demolition during the post World War II period, another time of transition and rapid progress in Japanese history.

Though it is still operated by Nagoya Railroad, a subsidiary company was created in 2003 to oversee it and nearby Little World. Due to the recent financial declines with Nagoya Railroad the future of the park is in question. While renovations had been put on hold for a time, work on moving the Shibakawa Yashiki from Nishinomiya, Hyōgo was begun in January 2005.

Buildings 
Notable buildings of historical or cultural importance including those of later eras are preserved, including a few Japanese style buildings. Eleven of the buildings are designated as Important Cultural Assets, and nearly all the rest are registered as tangible cultural assets. The museum includes buildings from Hawaii and Seattle in the United States, and also Brazil. A steam locomotive and street car, along with shuttle buses and horse-drawn carriages, provide transportation within the grounds. An operational historic post office is included among the 67 buildings (as of 2005). Though some buildings are somewhat empty, others have displays showing the history of the building and period, period furniture, and other displays.

The entrance and lobby of the Imperial Hotel was saved and moved from Tokyo between 1967 and 1985. Though only the entrance and lobby remain, it is the largest structure in Meiji Mura.

Other structures preserved at Meiji Mura include Lafcadio Hearn's summer house from Shizuoka (1868), St. John's Church from Kyoto (1907) designed by James McDonald Gardiner and Kyoto's old St. Francis Xavier Catholic Cathedral (1890).  The former cathedral is available to rent for weddings.

One of the traditional merchant houses that survived from Nagoya is the Tōmatsu House (東松家住宅, Tōmatsu-ka jūtaku), which was constructed in 1901 in Funairi-chō, Nagoya. It survived the bombing of Nagoya in World War II and was relocated to the museum in the 1970s. It has been designated by the government as an Important Cultural Property.

Village chiefs 
Famous Japanese actors have served as honorary village chief.

Musei Tokugawa (1965 ~ 1971)
Hisaya Morishige (1971 ~ 2004)
Shoichi Ozawa (2004 ~ 2012)
Sawako Agawa (2015 ~ present)

See also 
 Showa-mura
 Taisho-mura
 Treaty of Portsmouth, 1905 – see table used by Russian and Japanese negotiators
 Edo-Tokyo Open Air Architectural Museum
 Greenfield Village

References

External links

Official Meiji Mura site
Article on Meiji Mura from Time Asia 2004/08/30

Museums in Aichi Prefecture
Architecture museums in Japan
Open-air museums in Japan
Relocated buildings and structures
Rebuilt buildings and structures in Japan
Meitetsu Group
Buildings of the Meiji period
1965 establishments in Japan
Museums established in 1965